The Serranía de Chiribiquete or Chiribiquete Mountains are a group of isolated table mountains in the Amazon Region of Colombia. The mountains are part of the western edge of the Guiana Shield.  The area is protected as a national park. This area is habitat for the Chiribiquete emerald (Chlorostilbon olivaresi), an endemic hummingbird. The waterfall Caño Paujil originates from the Serranía de Chiribiquete.

Protected area 

Chiribiquete National Park is the largest national park in Colombia and the largest tropical rainforest national park in the world. More than 600,000 traces of around 20,000 petroglyphs and pictographs have been discovered in the mountain chain, the oldest of which may date to 20,000 years BP. The rock art has been produced until the 16th century. The rock paintings were first recorded by the American botanist Richard Evans Schultes in the 1940s. Later investigations were carried out by Thomas van der Hammen. 

British wildlife filmmaker Mike Slee and Colombian photographer and explorer Francisco Forero Bonell photographed and filmed the rock paintings on the vertical rock faces within the park in 2014. Serranía de Chiribiquete is featured in the 2015 documentary Colombia, magia salvaje, which was made by Mike Slee.

References

Mountain ranges of Colombia

de:Serranía de Chiribiquete